Sonata pian' e forte was composed by Italian composer and organist Giovanni Gabrieli and published in 1597. This is one of the earliest known pieces of music to specify loud and quiet passages in print. (The distinction of being the first belongs to Adriano Banchieri's "Canzon undecima in echo" in 1596).

Description
 
The title Sonata pian’e forte refers to an instrumental piece that uses soft and loud dynamics. The piece is an example of the Venetian polychoral style, which developed in sixteenth-century northern Italy, and found particular favor at St Mark's Basilica due to architectural features of the interior. The term "Sonata" at this time referred specifically to a work originally conceived for instruments, as opposed to those based on vocal works. It was most probably intended for a Catholic service at either St Mark's, Venice or the Scuola Grande di San Rocco. It was written for eight instruments divided into two groups of four players, spatially separated.

Form

Gabrieli's Sonata pian ’e forte is a through-composed work, the structure of which is defined by dialogue between the two instrumental choirs. The formal division into an initial section (Mm. 1–31), a longer, relatively complex middle section (Mm. 31–71) and a final section (Mm. 71–81) conforms to the conventions prevalent at the time.

The overall form can be represented as follows:

• Mm. 1–14: Antecedent in choir 1 (piano) / 14 measures / G Dorian

• Mm. 14-25: Consequent in choir 2 (piano) / 12 measures / G Dorian with harmonic excursions into D major (m. 17) and F major (m. 21)

• Mm. 26–31: Both choirs tutti (forte) / 6 measures / C Mixolydian

• Mm. 31–71: Antiphonal middle section (continual alternation between piano and forte) / 40 measures total, divided into 12 + 12 + 8 + 8 measures; structured into phrases of differing lengths: 4 measures ( mm. 31–34), 2 measures (mm. 37/38) or 1 measure (m. 59) / continually modulating

• Mm. 71–81: Final section (piano, then forte) / 11 measures / cadence in G Dorian

Within the each section there are frequent examples of phrase elision, such as in m. 14, where the cadence of the first choir overlaps with the entrance of the second choir. Individual phrases often begin or end on weak beats within the measure.

See also
Giovanni Gabrieli
Baroque music

References

External links

Compositions by Giovanni Gabrieli
Spatial music